Pantographa scripturalis, the Andean leaf-roller, is a moth in the family Crambidae. It was described by Achille Guenée in 1854. It is found from Colombia to Bolivia. The habitat consists of cloud forests, where it has been recorded from altitudes between 800 and 1,800 meters.

The larvae feed on Tiliaceae species and probably other trees. They live within a rolled leaf of their host plant. The larvae have a green body and a black head.

References

Moths described in 1854
Spilomelinae